"Single Saturday Night" is a song recorded by American country music singer Cole Swindell. It was released on May 22, 2020 as the lead single from his fourth studio album Stereotype. The song was written by Swindell, Mark Holman, Ashley Gorley and Hardy, and produced by Michael Carter.

Background
Swindell shared to fans with the release of ‘Single Saturday Night’: “The past few months have been hard for everyone and I wanted to give the fans something fun to kick off summer.” "Single Saturday Night" is a comfort gift for fans due to his tour was postponed during the COVID-19 pandemic.

Critical reception
ABC News called the song: “uptempo and summer-ready”. Website Taste of Country commented: "is a great way to kick off a weekend."

Commercial performance
The song reached No. 26 on Billboard Hot 100 chart in 2021, becoming Swindell's highest peak since "Chillin' It" in 2013.

Music video
Swindell accepted an interview and said: “I have loved this song since the first listen and wanted to create a video that was just as special!” “We had to get really creative shooting because we were still in quarantine during the COVID-19 pandemic, and it ended being one of the most fun videos I’ve ever done. Because of having that extra time I was able to be really involved in the creative and editing process and this video is a snapshot of my quarantine of trying to tune out all of the bad news and dreaming of being back out on the road at live shows with my band and fans.”

The music video directed by Michael Monaco and Eder Acevedo. It was shot during the COVID-19 pandemic quarantine, Swindell sit on the sofa, slept and heard the news about the COVID-19 pandemic, then he was took to all over the world, after he woke up, to beach, desert, space and beyond surrounded by his friends and his band.

Charts

Weekly charts

Year-end charts

Certifications

References

2020 singles
2020 songs
Cole Swindell songs
Songs written by Ashley Gorley
Songs written by Hardy (singer)
Songs written by Cole Swindell
Warner Records Nashville singles